Jair Rosa (full name Jair Rosa Pereyra, born November 6, 1975 in Montevideo) is a former Uruguayan footballer. He last played for River Plate in Uruguayan First Division.

References

External links
 

Uruguayan footballers
1975 births
Living people
Rocha F.C. players
Club Atlético River Plate (Montevideo) players
La Luz F.C. players
Association football midfielders